William R. Roy Jr. (born May 11, 1954) is an American politician who served as a Democratic member of the Kansas House of Representatives from 1985 to 1992. Roy was the son of U.S. Congressman and Senatorial candidate Bill Roy. He was elected to the 53rd district in 1984, serving from 1985 to 1990, and one additional term in the 54th district from 1991 to 1992. He resided in Topeka, Kansas.

References

1954 births
Living people
Democratic Party members of the Kansas House of Representatives
20th-century American politicians
Politicians from Topeka, Kansas